The Pennsylvania Public Television Network (PPTN) was the state agency that funded and supported public television stations within the Commonwealth of Pennsylvania. Its funding was eliminated in the Commonwealth's 2009–2010 budget and transferred to the Public Television Technology appropriation in the Executive Offices (Office of Administration). The motif of PPTN has since been revived as Pennsylvania PBS.

Member stations
 WLVT-TV in Allentown
 WQLN in Erie
 WITF-TV in Harrisburg
 WHYY-TV and WYBE in Philadelphia
 WQED in Pittsburgh
 WVIA-TV in Scranton/Wilkes-Barre/Hazleton
 WPSU-TV in State College

References

 Official website (June 14, 2006 archive)
Website of revival as Pennsylvania PBS

PBS member networks
Television channels and stations disestablished in 2009
2009 disestablishments in Pennsylvania
Defunct television networks in the United States
State agencies of Pennsylvania
Defunct mass media in Pennsylvania